Allan Dias may refer to:

 Allan Dias (Indian footballer) (born 1986), Indian football midfielder
 Allan Dias (Brazilian footballer) (born 1988), Brazilian football attacking midfielder for São Bernardo

See also
 Alan Diaz (1947–2018), American photographer